The Rance Maritime is a canal in north western France.  It joins Saint Malo and Dinan.  It is 22.6 km long with two locks.  

One set of locks, at the Saint Malo side, replaced the old gate type locks with revolutionary curves locks in 1952, where each lock pivots on one point and are easier to open and close.

See also
List of canals in France

References

Canals in France